Douglas Patrick Thomas Jay, Baron Jay, PC (23 March 1907 – 6 March 1996) was a British Labour Party politician.

Early life
Educated at Winchester College and New College, Oxford, Jay won the Chancellor's English Essay in 1927 and gained a First in Literae Humaniores ('Greats') in 1929. He was a Fellow of All Souls from 1930 to 1937. His early career was as an economics journalist working for The Times (1929–33), The Economist (1933–37) and the Daily Herald (1937–41), then as a civil servant in the Ministry of Supply and the Board of Trade, from 1943 as personal assistant to Hugh Dalton.

In The Socialist Case (1937) he wrote: "in the case of nutrition and health, just as in the case of education, the gentleman in Whitehall really does know better what is good for people than the people know themselves". This statement was mercilessly exploited by the Conservatives and won him long-lasting notoriety; it has often been paraphrased as "the man in Whitehall knows best".

Parliamentary career
Jay was elected member of Parliament for Battersea North at a by-election in July 1946, representing the Labour Party, and held the seat until the constituency was abolished at the 1983 general election.

Alongside Evan Durbin and Hugh Gaitskell, he brought the thinking of John Maynard Keynes to the Labour Party, especially in relation to price determination. Later his views somewhat changed, as he became influenced by the successful operation of rationing during the war. He served as Economic Secretary to the Treasury from 1947 to 1950, Financial Secretary to the Treasury from 1950 to 1951 and President of the Board of Trade from 1964 until being sacked in 1967. He was sworn of the Privy Council in 1951.

He was opposed to the UK's entry into the European Communities, and campaigned for a 'no' vote in the 1975 referendum.

Honours
Jay was created a life peer as Baron Jay, of Battersea in Greater London, on 8 October 1987.

Family

In 1933 he married the councillor Peggy Jay; their marriage ended in divorce. Their eldest son is the economist Peter Jay, who married (and later divorced) Margaret Callaghan, daughter of James Callaghan with whom Douglas Jay had served in government. Their twin daughters, Helen and Catherine, achieved a fashionable profile in the 1960s. Douglas Jay's second wife, Mary Thomas, had been one of his assistant private secretaries at the Board of Trade.

Publications
 The Socialist Case (1937)
 Who is to Pay for the War and the Peace? (1941)
 Socialism in the New Society (1962)
 After the Common Market (1968)
 Change and Fortune (1980) (autobiography)
 Sterling: A Plea for Moderation (1985)

Notes and references

External links 

1907 births
1996 deaths
Alumni of New College, Oxford
British Secretaries of State
Fellows of All Souls College, Oxford
Labour Party (UK) MPs for English constituencies
Labour Party (UK) life peers
Members of the Fabian Society
Members of the Privy Council of the United Kingdom
Ministers in the Attlee governments, 1945–1951
Ministers in the Wilson governments, 1964–1970
People educated at Winchester College
Presidents of the Board of Trade
UK MPs 1945–1950
UK MPs 1950–1951
UK MPs 1951–1955
UK MPs 1955–1959
UK MPs 1959–1964
UK MPs 1964–1966
UK MPs 1966–1970
UK MPs 1970–1974
UK MPs 1974
UK MPs 1974–1979
UK MPs 1979–1983
Life peers created by Elizabeth II